Jubb al-Safa (also spelled Jeb Safa) is a village in southern Syria, administratively part of the Markaz Rif Dimashq District of the Rif Dimashq Governorate, located just east of Damascus. Nearby localities include al-Buwaydah to the southeast, al-Masmiyah to the south, Ghabaghib to the southwest, Kanakir to the west, Khan Dannun to the northwest, Deir Ali to the north and Khirbet al-Ward to the northeast. According to the Syria Central Bureau of Statistics (CBS), Beit Sawa had a population of 2,499 in the 2004 census.

References

External links
  Map of town, Google Maps

Populated places in Markaz Rif Dimashq District